The Compagnie Algérienne, from 1942 o 1948 Compagnie Algérienne de Crédit et de Banque ("Algerian Credit and Banking Company"), was a significant French bank with operations in Algeria, Morocco, Tunisia and Lebanon as well as mainland France. It was formed in 1877 in a restructuring of its predecessor entity, the Société Générale Algérienne ("General Algerian Company"), itself founded in 1865-68. The Compagnie Algérienne eventually merged in 1960 with the Banque de l'Union Parisienne.

Société Générale Algérienne

The SGA's founders included prominent French and international financiers such as Edward Charles Blount, and Paulin Talabot, as well as landowning French colonists in Algeria. The company’s head office was established at 11-13, rue des Capucines in Paris, adjacent to the Crédit Foncier's own headquarters complex. 

The SGA subsequently acquired vast landholdings and lent to finance mining, infrastructure and land development projects in Algeria, funded mainly by bond issuance. It opened banking offices in Algiers, Bône, Constantine, Oran as well as Marseille in 1869, and also provided short-term credit to Spain and Egypt. This dynamic expansion resulted in financial overstretch during the downturn of the mid-1870s, which also severely impacted Crédit Foncier, the SGA's main sponsor together with Société Générale.

Compagnie Algérienne

The Compagnie endeavored to develop its vast holdings in Algeria for agricultural production, and became a major provider of rural and urban mortgages. It expanded the SGA's previous commercial banking operations and opened new branches between 1878 and 1906 in Blida, Bougie, Mascara, Médéa, Sétif, Sidi Bel Abbès, and Souk Ahras.. 

By 1920, its Algerian branch network extended to Affreville (now Khemis Miliana), Aïn Beïda, Aïn Témouchent, Algiers, Aumale (now Sour El-Ghozlane), Batna, Blida, Boghari, Bône (now Annaba), Bordj Bou Arréridj, Bordj Bouira, Bordj Menaïel, Boufarik, Bougie, Colea, Constantine, Djidjelli, Guelma, Jemmapes (now Azzaba), Khenchela, Maison-Carrée (now El Harrach), Marengo (now Hadjout), Mascara, Médéa, Mostaganem, Orléansville (now Chlef), Palikao (now Tighennif), Philippeville (now Skikda), Relizane, Rio-Salado (now El Malah), Saïda, Saint-Arnaud (now El Eulma), Saint-Denis-de-Sig, Sétif, Sidi Bel Abbès, Soukahra, Tiaret, Tlemcen, and Vialar (now Tissemsilt).

The Compagnie soon expanded in the newly established French protectorate of Tunisia, with a branch in Tunis as early as 1881, followed by Sfax, Bizerte, and Sousse, then Béja and Mateur in 1909, and Gabès, Kairouan and Souk El Arba (now Jendouba) in 1910. In Morocco, it opened branches in Tangier in 1904, Casablanca in 1906, Safi and Oujda in 1910, Larache, Mazagan (now El Jadida) and Rabat in 1911. In the early 1910s it complemented its long-established presence in Marseille with branches on the French Riviera in Antibes, Cannes, Menton, Nice, and Vence, as well as Vichy. This expansion mirrored the rapid increase in the Compagnie's balance sheet and volume of operations in the first decades of the 20th century, in contrast to its comparatively slow development in the 1880s and 1890s. Its network of branches and offices thus grew from 65 in 1912 to 95 in 1921 and 180 in late 1931. In 1931, it also opened a branch in Beirut, from which it developed operations in Lebanon and Syria then under French administration.

In Paris, the Compagnie Algérienne's head office was successively established at 11-13 rue des Capucines (1877-1908), the former seat of the SGA; 22, rue Louis-Le-Grand (1908-1916); and 48-50, rue d'Anjou (1916-1960). In Algiers, it moved to a new building in 1910. In Marseille, it built an opulent branch at 17, rue Saint-Ferréol in 1919, and in Lyon, an art deco building at 5, rue du Bât-d'Argent in the early 1930s. By 1929, it was the eleventh-largest French bank by collected deposits. In the interwar period, it deepened its business relationship with Banque Mirabaud and correspondingly grew its investment banking operations. Its business was comparatively resilient during the crisis of the 1930s.

Aftermath

In 1960, the Banque de l'Union Parisienne (BUP), which had pre-existing financial links with both the Banque Mirabaud and its partner the Compagnie Algérienne, purchased the latter outright and merged it with its own parent entity. The banking subsidiary CACB was kept as a separate operation, and renamed  (CFCB) as of  following Algerian independence. A new subsidiary, the "CFCB-Société Nouvelle", was created in 1965 and on  took over the CFCB's banking network in mainland France.

In 1971, that entity was renamed simply Banque de l'Union Parisienne, and Suez sold its 80% equity stake to the Banque de Paris et des Pays-Bas, which in turn merged it with the Crédit du Nord in 1973.

The Algerian operations, left in the "old" CFCB retained by Suez, were the matter of protracted negotiations between Suez and the Algerian authorities.

The CFCB's Beirut branch was subsidiarized in 1967 as the Banque Libano-Française, which in 1992 became majority-owned by Banque Indosuez. The CFCB's Tunisian operations were acquired in 1968 by the Banque de Tunisie. The CFCB's Moroccan subsidiary, the SMCB, was acquired by Moroccan investors in 1968. It was renamed Wafabank in 1985, and in 2003 merged with Banque Commerciale du Maroc to form Attijariwafa Bank.

Leadership
 , Chairman of the Société Générale Algérienne 1868-1877
 Jules Tarbé des Sablons, Chairman 1878-1893
 Lucien Bordet, Chairman 1893-1923
 , Chairman 1923-1942
 Jean Pallier, Chairman 1942-1960

See also
 Banque de l'Algérie
 Compagnie Marocaine

Notes

French Algeria
Banks of Algeria
Economic history of Algeria
Defunct companies of Algeria
Defunct banks of France
Defunct banks of Africa